Unofficial South American Championships in Athletics were held in Montevideo, Uruguay on May 8–10, 1931.  The event was held in celebration of the 100th anniversary of Uruguayan independence.

Medal summary
Medal winners are published.

Men

Medal table (unofficial)

References

External links
gbrathletics.com

U 1931
1931 in Uruguayan sport
1931 in athletics (track and field)
1931 in South American sport
International athletics competitions hosted by Uruguay